Psychomastax is a genus of monkey grasshoppers in the family Eumastacidae. There are at least four described species in Psychomastax.

Species
These four species belong to the genus Psychomastax:
 Psychomastax deserticola Hebard, 1934 (desert monkey grasshopper)
 Psychomastax inyo Rehn & Grant, 1959 (White Mountain grasshopper)
 Psychomastax psylla Rehn & Hebard, 1918 (San Jacinto monkey grasshopper)
 Psychomastax robusta Hebard, 1934 (robust monkey grasshopper)

References

Further reading

 

Eumastacidae
Articles created by Qbugbot